Morgan & Morgan is an American law firm. Founded in 1988 by John Morgan, it is headquartered in Orlando, Florida. While Morgan & Morgan was historically considered a firm focused on personal injury, medical malpractice and class action lawsuits, it also expanded practices to other areas of legal services. The firm has offices in 49 U.S. states and Washington, D.C.

History 

The law firm was established in 1988 by John Morgan and his partners Stewart Colling and Ron Gilbert. From the start, the company has been headquartered in Orlando, Florida.

In 1989, the law firm began advertising on television and radio. In 2005, Morgan bought out his partners' share of the company and renamed the firm "Morgan & Morgan", also adding his wife Ultima as partner. As Orlando Sentinel quotes, "John Morgan and his partners had a fundamental difference over growth and expansion of the law firm throughout Florida at the time".

By early 2000s, the firm expanded throughout Florida with 420 employees, and by 2013 the company had 260 attorneys among 1,800 staffers in Florida, Georgia, Mississippi, Kentucky and Manhattan.

In January 2011, Charlie Crist joined the Tampa office of Morgan & Morgan after expressing an interest in returning to the legal field during his final week in office as governor of Florida. Crist worked primarily in the firm's class-action sector as a complex-litigation attorney, serving as a "rainmaker" for the firm. In November 2016, after almost six years with the firm, he was elected to represent Florida's 13th congressional district. In February 2018, Brad Slager of Sunshine State News cited evidence that Morgan & Morgan was "attempting to purge all evidence" of its relationship with Crist now that he was a "rookie congressman" with "little-to-no power".

In 2018, the firm received over two million phone calls and signed up 500 new cases each day. That year, the firm collected $1.5 billion in settlements and spent $130 million nationwide on advertising. John Morgan was one of the first lawyers to advertise in phone books and television commercials.

In 2021, Morgan fired half of his firm's marketing department. The staffing purge came in the wake of a controversial Morgan & Morgan national advertising campaign, "Size Matters," which was meant to convey the large scale of the firm, but was criticized as an inappropriate dick joke. The staffers who were fired had criticized the ad campaign's phallic implications.

As of 2022, the law firm had over 3,000 employees, including 800 lawyers in 49 states.

Notable cases 

R.J. Reynolds Tobacco Company. The law firm was successful in a major lawsuit against the second-largest tobacco company in the U.S. (behind Altria) after years of litigation. The case was handled on behalf of the widow and son of Arthur Brown. Mr. Brown passed away due to complications related to tobacco use. Morgan & Morgan's attorneys contended that the client was misled by the tobacco company's marketing campaigns that promoted "safer tobacco products", and that the company "fraudulently concealed or conspired to conceal information about the long-term health effects" of smoking. The court ordered R.J. Reynolds Tobacco Company to pay $5 million in economic damages and $8.5 million in punitive damages to the family of the victim.
2016 Florida Amendment 2. A political and legal campaign to allow use of medical marijuana. In 2013, Morgan & Morgan launched the initiative to change the Florida Constitution to allow marijuana for medical purposes. The firm spent over $15 million to support the change and organized United for Care campaign to promote the "yes" vote.
2020 Florida Amendment 2 was an initiative to promote an amendment to the Constitution of Florida that passed on November 3, 2020, via a statewide referendum. Morgan & Morgan was a major donor to the political committee Florida for a Fair Wage, donating the bulk of the $4.15 million raised by the campaign. The amendment required 60% of the popular vote to pass. As a result, hourly minimum wage in the state of Florida is set to increase to $15 by 2026.
Exactis class action lawsuit. The case was filed by Morgan & Morgan, DiCello Levitt & Casey and Robbins Geller Rudman & Dowd law firms in 2018 after alleged a data breach affecting 230 million Americans and 110 million businesses.
Healogics Inc. After Morgan & Morgan filed a lawsuit, Florida-based Healogics Inc. agreed to pay $22.51 million to settle False Claims Act allegations that it knowingly billed Medicare for unnecessary services for its patients. The case was settled in 2018.
Daytona Beach Rollercoaster Incident. Morgan & Morgan, along with other law firms, represented many victims of the Sand Blaster roller coaster crash that occurred on June 15, 2018 on the Daytona Beach Boardwalk, when the roller coaster derailed causing major incident.
Bethenny Frankel vs TikTok Inc. The case was filed on October 6, 2022 with the U.S. District Court for the Southern District of New York after the former reality TV actress Bethenny Frankel learnt that "her images and video content were being used to sell counterfeit products". The basis for the lawsuit was the technology of TikTok, owned by the Chinese company ByteDance, that allowed users to create fake images and videos where Bethenny Frankel appeared promoting various goods and services in violation of Frankel's right of publicity. As the Bloomberg Law cites: “Bethenny Frankel requested on behalf of herself and the unknown number of individuals nationwide whose personas were similarly misused that TikTok violated class members’ right of publicity and engaged in unfair competition; injunctive relief; order requiring TikTok to dispose of materials and copies of any materials that contain or reflect any information derived from Frankel’s and class members’ personas, voices, content, and/or likenesses.” The class-action lawsuit and the issue of public rights and counterfeit products gained the attention of the major media outlets, including The Washington Post, Reuters, Bloomberg News, The Hollywood Reporter  and Newsweek, among many others.
2022 Chesapeake shooting. Following the mass shooting incident at a Walmart Supercenter in Virginia, employees filed two $50 million lawsuits against the company. According to the plaintiffs, Walmart neglected its obligations to ensure staff safety, as complaints were made repeatedly to corporate management regarding the harassing and violent behavior of the shooter during his employment.

Political involvement 

Morgan donated to Hillary Clinton's 2016 presidential campaign. Morgan gave $355,000 to the Biden Victory Fund in August 2020. Morgan is close to Joe Biden's younger brother, Frank Biden. Morgan flew Frank Biden to Joe Biden's inauguration in his private jet. Morgan said he talked to Frank Biden about job opportunities at Morgan & Morgan.

Morgan & Morgan contributed $1.5 million toward a proposed Florida constitutional amendment to raise the hourly minimum wage to $15. Orlando Weekly reported that some employees at Morgan & Morgan made less than $15 per hour. When questioned by Orlando Weekly, Morgan said that many of his call center employees start out with a $25,000 annual salary.

References

External links
 

Privately held companies of the United States
Law firms based in Florida
Law firms established in 1988
Law firms specializing in personal injury
Patent law firms
Intellectual property law firms